

List of the federal subjects of Russia by homicide rate (homicides per 100,000)

List of the federal subjects of Russia by total murder count

See also
 Crime in Russia
 List of U.S. states by homicide rate
 List of Brazilian states by murder rate
 List of Mexican states by homicides
 List of cities by murder rate
 Homicide in world cities

References

Murder in Russia
Russia
Russia, murder rate